Epoch is a 2001 science fiction film directed by Matt Codd, starring David Keith, Stephanie Niznik, Brian Thompson, and Shannon Lee. The film concerns the discovery of a strange and mysterious monolith, and the tribulations faced by the team sent to study it.

Plot
Four billion years ago, before life had developed on Earth, a cosmic object fell in the seas of our planet. In modern times in the mountains of Bhutan, a huge artifact makes its way to the surface, producing a powerful electromagnetic pulse causing worldwide blackouts.

Alarmed by the electromagnetic phenomenon and under request of the government of Bhutan, the American NSA launches a military and scientific reconnaissance operation on site, led by Dr. K.C. Czaban (Stephanie Niznik) with the technical assistance of terminally ill engineer Mason Rand (David Keith), picked up on the Mexican border in time for the mission. The team finds the artifact suspended in the air and object of veneration from the natives, who call it the Torus and consider it a gift from the gods with extraordinary healing properties.

The US team enters the Torus, but an air strike by the Chinese Army against the artifact prompts an unexpected response from the object, which destroys two Chinese military planes and kidnaps a US soldier. Unsuccessful diplomatic negotiations escalate the  tension in the area between Chinese and US armed forces, while inside the Torus the scientific team goes to the core of the huge machine. They discover how ancient the artifact is and speculate it could have been the spark of life on Earth, as well as the cause of multiple extinctions in the course of the eras. Fomented by NSA agent Allen Lysander (Ryan O'Neal), conflict explodes between the troops of the two factions and the Torus reacts, blanketing the planet with a thick cloud cover, evidently starting the process for a new mass extinction.

By Presidential order, the US soldiers plant a nuclear bomb inside the Torus to destroy it, and Czaban and Rand unsuccessfully try to deactivate the device to keep it from detonating. However, the Torus absorbs the blast and, seemingly satisfied by the extreme sacrifice attempted by the two scientists, ceases its actions, sheds its external shell and, in the form of an energy sphere, leaves Earth. Four months later, Rand, now cured after his exposure to Torus, receives from Czaban the news that she is pregnant, despite being sterile before their encounter with the alien artifact.

Cast 
 David Keith - Dr. Mason Rand
 Stephanie Niznik - Dr. K.C. Czaban
 Ryan O'Neal - Allen Lysander
 Brian Thompson - Capt. Tower
 Steve Bond - Colonel Tell
 Craig Wasson - Hudson
 Michael Cavanaugh - Williams
 Shannon Lee - Pamela
 James Avery - Dr. Solomon Holt
 James Hong - Ambassador Po
 Joseph Patrick Kelly - Control Tech (as Joe Kelly)
 Donald Li - Chinese Scientist
 William Zabka - Rover Driver Joe
 Marc McClure - German Scientist
 Eloy Casados - Mexican Doctor

Marketing
On November 24, 2001, the Sci Fi Channel's debut airing of Epoch garnered a 2.3 rating, or 1.7 million household, becoming the network's highest-rated original movie, surpassing the miniseries Frank Herbert's Dune (2000). The film, which the network purchased from the United Film Organization, had solely been marketed with on-air promos.

Epoch: Evolution
Epoch: Evolution is the 2003 sequel to Epoch, directed by Ian Watson and written by Sam Wells with David Keith and Brian Thompson reprising their roles from the original film.

References

External links
 (official site), Sci Fi Channel. Archived from the original on December 3, 2003.
 
 
 

2001 science fiction films
2001 films
Films set in Bhutan
Syfy original films
American science fiction films
2000s English-language films
2000s American films